The Yir-Yoront, also known as the Yir Yiront, are an Indigenous Australian people of the Cape York Peninsula now living mostly in Kowanyama (kawn yamar or 'many waters') but also in Lirrqar/Pormpuraaw, both towns outside their traditional lands.

Language
Yir-Yoront belongs to the Pama-Maric group of the Pama-Nyungan language family. Etymologically their language and the ethnonym derived from it are composed of yirrq (speech) and yorront. Several roots for Yorronthave been proposed, one suggesting it is derived from yorr(l) (thus, like this), this-style denominations for tribal languages being not infrequent in Australia. Alpher argues that the more convincing etymon is yorr (sand), sandridges constituting the core geomorphic feature of Yir Yoront traditional territory. To support this interpretation he notes that an alternative voice for both the people and the language is Yirr-Thuchm, where thuch denotes a sandridge.

The Yoront adopt sign language when people withdraw from their social world, or are ashamed of themselves.

Country
The earliest explorers came across the Yir-Yoront in their traditional lands, each sectioned according to patrilineal clan divisions, at the separate mouths of the Mitchell River, and also the mouth of the Coleman River, and the land on the coastal strip between them.

Mythology
Pam-nhing were the ancestral supernatural beings responsible for both the creation of the world and for the way the group was organized socially. Every site was associated with its ancestral pam-nhing owner, to whom living Yir-Yoront owners were related through the male line. The word also signified a doppelganger or guardian spirit, distinct from both one's mang (reflection, image) and the pam-ngerrr or inner soul, pulse, breath of a person.

Society
Yir-Yoront land divisions were based on patrilineal clans, each of which had a swathe of territory segments of which, on the birth of individual clan-members was then assigned to members according to their respective conception totems. That is, their names were drawn from their clan totems. This territory extended into the tribal areas of the Kuuk-Thaayorre and Yirrq-mayn (Bakanh) to their north and northwest through political alliances and exogamous marriages that led to Yir-Yoront people adopting other languages ). Their clan system was composed of two moieties, the Pam-Pip and the Pam-Lul.

Ontology
The Yir-Yoront distinguishes ordinary humans where   denotes 'real', from beings in the other world or realm of the dead, spirits and malevolent beings, from dreamed entities, and the ancestral beings of the primal time of Creation. By metaphoric extension whites fall outside the category of real beings and are classified under , vagrant other world beings of malevolent intent.

Lerrn nerp, literally spirit-child, was the animating figure at conception, the natural object that was the agent of concept was conceived of as an 'image' (mang). While the father's role in conception is acknowledged, pregnancy itself takes place only when the  immigrates into the body during copulation.

History
The Dutch exploratory mission under Jan Carstenszoon landed in 1623 on the coast where the Yir-Yoront dwelt, in order to trade for necessities. The logbook reports that the Dutch found a people who had "no knowledge of precious metals or spices". All the goods the Dutch gave in exchange were still in use among the Yir-Yoront save for pieces of iron and beads. The iron had never been incorporated into their totemic ideology.

A clash that in whiteman's memory became known as the "Battle of the Mitchell River," in 1864 between European colonists driving cattle under Francis Lascelles Jardine to the newly established station at Somerset and the probable forebears of the Yir-Yoront led to the death of some 30 odd tribesman with many more probably injured. It is judged to have been one of the rare instances in which Australian aboriginals stood their ground in the face of withering European gunfire for any length of time. During intensive field work in 1933–1935 the American anthropologist Lauriston Sharp failed to elicit any hint of a memory that the incident had occurred. The Australian anthropologist W.E.H Stanner cited the essay to question the very notion of a perduring and stable tradition within Aboriginal society, since it appeared that crucial events could vanish from memory within a brief period. Nonie Sharp however stated much later that the event was still fresh in the memories of the dispersed tribes living in Kowanyama down to the present day.

Down to the 1930s the Yir-Yoront were relatively autonomous, living in areas not at that time subject to pastoralist expropriation. They were then drawn into the Mitchell River Mission and also, soon after, in 1942, at Edward River Mission (known to the Yir-Yoront as Lirrqar, though now known by its Kuuk-Thaayorre name, Pormpuraaw), with the ready availability of steel axes and fishhooks living on the missions afforded, together with sugar and tobacco. The introduction of steel tools, it is argued, radically disrupted the culture, since even rock axes were not fashioned by the Yir-Yoront, whose territory was short on suitable rock outcrops, and who had to get them through long-distance trade and exchange networks. Once nearby purchase became accessible, the facility had a revolutionizing ripple down effect of disruption on the earlier exchange system, breaking the monopoly of the elders. Older men avoided initially the missions, and thus the young men and women could obtain the much-sought axes there without having to wait on their male elders, obey the ritual traditions, but simply in exchange for their labour at the missions.

"They don't work"
In 1958 Lauriston Sharp argued that the Yir-Yoront were devoid of politics because they could only think of relationship in terms of kinship system. This was cited in turn by Marshall Sahlins in his Stone Age Economics who argued that while what we call institutional differentiation exists among them, they do not, as civilized people do, draw a clear line between work and play. The economist Robert L. Heilbroner took this to mean that the concept of work was absent from the most primitive societies, such as the Trobriand Islanders, the !Kung and, citing for this Sahlins' ostensible authority, also the Yir-Yoront, who, he asserted 'use the same word for work and play'. Barry Alpher showed that though their word 'woq' looks like a post-colonial borrowing from English 'work', it can be paralleled in other aboriginal languages cf. 'wuku' attested in the Djabugay language.  For the Yir-Yoront, therefore, woq is applied to 'activity of any kind done for a boss and/or (for) pay.'  Heilbroner's prominent claim was flawed from the start.

Alternative names
 Koka-mungin
 KokoMandjoen, Koko-manjoen
 Kokomindjan
 KokoMindjin, Kokominjan, KokoMinjen
 Yir-yiront

Source:

Some words
 wart'. (bad)
 wart'uwər. (woman)

Notes

Citations

Sources

Aboriginal peoples of Queensland
Far North Queensland